Agrapha gammaloba is a moth of the family Noctuidae. It is found on Madagascar.

References

Plusiinae
Moths described in 1910
Moths of Madagascar
Moths of Africa